Robert Mihai Geantă (born 7 April 1997) is a Romanian professional footballer who plays as a goalkeeper for CSM Focșani. Geantă also played for Italian side Altamura and in the Liga III for Înainte Modelu.

References

External links
 

1997 births
Living people
People from Argeș County
Romanian footballers
Association football goalkeepers
Romania youth international footballers
Liga II players
FC Metaloglobus București players
CSM Focșani players
Romanian expatriate footballers
Romanian expatriate sportspeople in Italy
Expatriate footballers in Italy